Robert or Rob Ackerman may refer to:

Robert Allan Ackerman (1944–2022), American film director
Rob Ackerman (rugby) (born 1961), Welsh rugby player
Rob Ackerman  (playwright) (born 1958), American playwright

See also
Ackerman (surname)